Daniël Rossel (born 24 July 1960) is a Belgian former racing cyclist. He won the 16th stage of the 1984 Vuelta a España.

Major results

1978
1st Tour of Flanders Juniors
1983
2nd Paris-Bruxelles
3rd GP Stad Vilvoorde
1984
1st Stage 16 Vuelta a España
1st Le Samyn
6th GP Victor Standaert
1985
5th Brussel-Ingooigem

References

External links

1960 births
People from Uccle
Living people
Belgian male cyclists
Belgian Vuelta a España stage winners
Cyclists from Brussels